The Waikorure River is a river of the Hawke's Bay region of New Zealand's North Island. It flows through undulating hill country to the Heretaunga Plains near Hastings.

See also
List of rivers of New Zealand

References

Rivers of the Hawke's Bay Region
Rivers of New Zealand